Lee Gi-Dong  (born 11 May 1984) is a South Korean footballer.

Career

He is the first player to advance from the K3 League to the K League 1.

References

External links 

1984 births
Living people
Association football forwards
South Korean footballers
Pohang Steelers players
Ulsan Hyundai FC players
K League 1 players